The National Capital Territory of Delhi has 11 administrative districts. Below is a list of the various District centres of Delhi:

South Delhi
 Nehru Place
 Saket District Centre

East Delhi
 Laxmi Nagar

Central Delhi
 Jhandewalan
 Rajendra Place

North West Delhi
 Manglam Place (Rohini)
 Netaji Subhash Place (Pitampura ; Shakurpur ; Wazirpur)

West Delhi
 Janakpuri
 Shivaji Place (Rajouri Garden)

See also
Districts of Delhi

References
Master Plan for Delhi 2021